Alfred Perry (8 October 1904 – 4 December 1974) was a professional golfer from England, the winner of The Open Championship in 1935.

Born in Coulsdon, Surrey, Perry worked as a club professional at Leatherhead Golf Club in addition to playing in the few organised tournaments that there were at the time. He had moderate success before he claimed an unexpected victory in the 1935 Open Championship at Muirfield. His most prolific year came in 1938 when he won three tournaments on the British circuit. He retired from his post at Leatherhead in 1972, and died two years later.

Perry was a member of the British Ryder Cup team in 1933, 1935, and 1937. He played three matches of which he lost two and halved one.

Professional wins
This list may be incomplete
1924 Findlater Shield
1925 Findlater Shield
1935 The Open Championship
1936 West of England Professional Championship
1938 Daily Mail Tournament, Yorkshire Evening News Tournament, Dunlop-Metropolitan Tournament
1948 Northern Professional Championship

Major championships

Wins (1)

Results timeline

Note: Perry only played in The Open Championship

NT = No tournament
CUT = missed the half-way cut
"T" indicates a tie for a place

Team appearances
Ryder Cup (representing Great Britain): 1933, 1935, 1937
England–Ireland Professional Match (representing England): 1932 (winners)
England–Scotland Professional Match (representing England): 1933 (winners), 1936 (winners), 1938 (winners)
Coronation Match (representing the Ladies and Professionals): 1937

References

English male golfers
Winners of men's major golf championships
Ryder Cup competitors for Europe
People from Coulsdon
1904 births
1974 deaths